Temmy Shmull is a Palauan politician. He worked in the government as a foreign service officer and later became an advisor to Thomas Remengesau Sr. in 1985. He then became the Chief of Staff of President Kuniwo Nakamura before becoming Minister of State of Palau from 2001-2009 under Thomas Remengesau Jr. He has been the Governor of Peleliu since January 2013.

References

Living people
Governors of Peleliu
People from Peleliu
Year of birth missing (living people)